Fred Anthony Young (August 27, 1904 – October 16, 1973) was an American lawyer and politician from New York.

Life
He was born on August 27, 1904, in Whitehall, Washington County, New York, the son of Dominick Young (1872–1958) and Isabel (Izzo) Young (1882–1947). He graduated B.S. from St. Lawrence University, and LL.B. from Albany Law School. On June 6, 1929, he married Marjorie Farrington (1907–1988), of Lowville, and they had two children. In 1931, he began to practice law in his wife's hometown.

Young was a member of the New York State Assembly (Lewis Co.) in 1936, 1937 and 1938.

He was a member of the New York State Senate from 1939 to 1949, sitting in the 162nd, 163rd, 164th, 165th and 166th New York State Legislatures. He was a delegate to the 1944 and 1948 Republican National Conventions. He was re-elected to the 167th New York State Legislature, but on the opening day of the legislative session, January 5, 1949, he resigned his seat and took office as a justice of the New York Court of Claims. He was appointed as Presiding Justice of the Court of Claims in 1962, and retired from the bench in 1972.

He was Chairman of the New York State Republican Committee and a member of the Republican National Committee from 1963 to 1965; and a delegate to the 1964 Republican National Convention.

He died on October 15, 1973, in Albany Medical Center in Albany, New York, of cancer; and was buried at the Lowville Rural Cemetery.

Sources

External links
 

1904 births
1973 deaths
Republican Party New York (state) state senators
People from Lowville, New York
Republican Party members of the New York State Assembly
People from Whitehall, New York
New York (state) state court judges
Deaths from cancer in New York (state)
St. Lawrence University alumni
Albany Law School alumni
20th-century American lawyers
20th-century American judges
20th-century American politicians